The band-tailed antshrike (Thamnophilus melanothorax) is a species of bird in the family Thamnophilidae. It is found in the eastern Guianas of Suriname and French Guiana mostly; also Brazil, Guyana, and Atlantic regions of the Amazon Basin, and some local regions upstream on the Amazon. Its natural habitat is subtropical or tropical swamps.

The band-tailed antshrike was described by the English zoologist Philip Sclater in 1857 and given the binomial name Thamnophilus melanothorax. It was subsequently placed in the genus Sakesphorus. A molecular phylogenetic study published in 2007 found that Sakesphorus was polyphyletic and that three species including the band-tailed antshrike were embedded within a clade containing members of Thamnophilus. The band-tailed antshrike was therefore moved back to its original genus.

References

External links
Photo-Low Res; Article birdtours.co.uk

band-tailed antshrike
Birds of the Guianas
Birds of the Amazon Basin
band-tailed antshrike
band-tailed antshrike
Taxonomy articles created by Polbot